Claudia Álvarez (born Claudia Álvarez Ocampo, October 6, 1981) is a Mexican actress. Her debut was in 2004 on the soap opera Las Juanas in the role Juana Prudencia.

Career 
Claudia Alvarez began her career in television commercials in 1995, at the age of 13, soon after I file a Spanish company as an event, later went to college where she studied Advertising.
Shortly after Claudia left her advertising degree to dedicate herself to acting. Her roles were in the Mexican telenovela TV Azteca, Las Juanas where she gave life to one of the Juanas' Juana Prudencia, "so that became part of the CEFAC.

After that she played Sofia in the soap opera and TV Azteca and Canal Caracol Amores Cruzados credits with Colombian actress Ana Lucia Dominguez and Patricia Vásquez, with partner Claudia Michell Gurfi starring as the villain along with Colombian actress Andrea López.
She was part of telenovelas are looking for a man, and Pobre Diabla untamed beauty in the latter played the villain Santa stellar production starring Alejandra Lazcano.

In 2010 entered the ranks of Televisa which assumed interpret a main character in La Fuerza del Destino of Rosy Ocampo, but not anything specific, just after she was called by Pedro Torres that will join the cast of El Equipo.
In 2011, in the hands of Emilio Larrosa will play an important character in the telenovela of Televisa Dos Hogares sharing credits with Anahí and Carlos Ponce. She starred as Veronica, the main female antagonist, in the 2012 telenovela by Juan Osorio, Porque el amor manda which starred Fernando Colunga and Blanca Soto.

Filmography

Film

Television roles

Awards and nominations

References

External links

Reseña de Claudia Álvarez en TVNotas.com.mx  
Biografía de Claudia Álvarez  (en esmas) 

1981 births
Living people
Mexican telenovela actresses
Mexican television actresses
Mexican female models
21st-century Mexican actresses
Actresses from Mexico City